Bidiya or Bidiyyah is a town in Wilayah Bidiyyah (Province of Bidiyyah), in the middle of the Eastern Region of the Sultanate of Oman. It comprises fifteen villages, including Al Muntarib, Al Gabbi, Shahik, Al Rakah, Al Hawiyah, Al Shariq, Al Wasil and Al Dhahir.

Tourism
It is well known for the golden sand dunes that attract tourists from Oman and outside Oman. There are some ancient forts spread over Bidiyah, including the Al Muntarib Fort which was renowned by the Ministry of Culture.

Traditional Industry
Some of Bidiyah's people work as farmers. They raise well known breeds of camels and Arabian Horses. Also, they make metal items like the Omani khanjar (dagger).

Sport Events
Bidiyah is host to two sports events: the Bidiyah Challenge, and horse and camel racing.

The Bidiyah Challenge is held every February. It was recently introduced to the Persian Gulf region' sporting calendar. The aim of the race is to scale sand dunes in the least possible time driving a 4x4 car, mostly Jeeps and one-door Nissan Patrols.

Horse Races and camel Races are held during Eid days and during national day celebrations. Also, there is yearly festival which consists of a series of races for horses and camels, which are held under Royal Court Affairs supervision. Bidiyah hosts one of these races every year.

See also
 List of cities in Oman

References

Populated places in Oman